Marc Wachs (born 10 July 1995) is a German professional footballer who plays as a defender for Eintracht Frankfurt II.

References

External links
 

1995 births
Sportspeople from Wiesbaden
Footballers from Hesse
Living people
German footballers
Association football defenders
1. FSV Mainz 05 II players
Dynamo Dresden players
VfL Osnabrück players
SV Wehen Wiesbaden players
Eintracht Frankfurt II players
3. Liga players
Regionalliga players
Hessenliga players